The Frigate Range is a high mountain range extending  east from Mount Markham in the Queen Elizabeth Range of Antarctica. It was named by the northern party of the New Zealand Geological Survey Antarctic Expedition (1961–62) to commemorate the work of the New Zealand frigates on Antarctic patrol duties.

References

Mountain ranges of the Ross Dependency
Shackleton Coast